Wien Handelskai is a railway station serving Brigittenau, the twentieth district of Vienna.

The platform for the S45 are on the lower level while platforms for the S1, S2, S3, S4, and S7 are on the upper level, adjacent to the U-Bahn platforms.

References 

Handelskai
Austrian Federal Railways